Mwalimu Ally (born 8 May 1953) is a Tanzanian sprinter. He competed in the men's 100 metres at the 1980 Summer Olympics.

References

External links

1953 births
Living people
Athletes (track and field) at the 1980 Summer Olympics
Tanzanian male sprinters
Olympic athletes of Tanzania
Place of birth missing (living people)